Another Period is an American period sitcom television series created by and starring Natasha Leggero and Riki Lindhome. It followed the lives of the Bellacourts, the first family of Newport, Rhode Island, at the turn of the 20th century. Lillian (Leggero) and Beatrice (Lindhome) played sisters "who care only about how they look, what parties they attend and becoming famous, which is a lot harder in 1902". It was intended to be a spoof on reality shows like Keeping Up with the Kardashians while roughly contemporaneous with Downton Abbey and satirizing many of the same themes of class and social standing.

The series was picked up for 10 episodes and debuted on Comedy Central on June 23, 2015. It was directed by Jeremy Konner, co-creator and writer of Drunk History. Ben Stiller's production company Red Hour produced. Leggero, Lindhome, and Konner also served as executive producers. The second season premiered on June 15, 2016. On May 23, 2016, it was renewed for a third season, which premiered on January 23, 2018. In November 2018, Comedy Central announced it canceled the series after three seasons.

Cast

The House of Bellacourt
 Lillian Abigail Bellacourt, played by Natasha Leggero, is the second-eldest Bellacourt daughter, who is often seen wearing a tiara. After Charles Ponzi left her at the altar at age 11, "the height of a woman's sexual peak," she entered into a loveless marriage with Victor, with whom she has produced eight daughters, most of whom are named Susan. Lillian is smart and resourceful, but often falls victim to her own selfishness. Lillian consistently carries around her vicious chihuahua, Mayor Cutie, before killing the dog in a fit of rage. Following her deep depression when Laverne Fusselforth dies during their wedding ceremony and his grandson marries Hortense in the second-season finale, Lilian acquires a new chihuahua which she uses as a replacement Mayor Cutie.
 Beatrice Bellacourt, played by Riki Lindhome, is the youngest daughter. She is twin to Frederick, with whom she is involved in an incestuous relationship. Beatrice serves as the "ideal woman" of the turn of the century. Tall, rich, and slender, she is a talented singer with no interest in politics and no opinions of her own. She exhibits exceptional selfishness and sociopathic tendencies, attempting to murder people without empathy. She is an idiot savant, with flashes of scientific genius, and helps guest Albert Einstein solve the theory of relativity. She has several children, including a son whom she calls The Little Asshole. Since being sent away to a nunnery in the second-season finale by Frederick, Beatrice has lost romantic interest in him.
 Hortense Jefferson Library Bellacourt, played by Artemis Pebdani in the pilot episode, Lauren Ash in the remainder of the first season, Lauren Flans in the second season, and Donna Lynne Champlin in the third season, is the eldest Bellacourt child. Dodo and Commodore are both embarrassed by her unattractiveness, and "pray her life will be blessedly short." Hortense acts as a satire of the moderate bourgeoise feminist, calling for women's suffrage, and is a member of the Women's Temperance League as well as the Newport Association of Gal Spinsters (N.A.G.S.). Although Hortense is the most liberal character, she is as ruthless as any Bellacourt, exposing the family to ridicule when she sells their scandalous secrets to the press. In the second-season finale, Hortense married Bertram Harrison Fusselforth VII before their fiery automobile crash while on their honeymoon. Despite being reported dead, Hortense is revealed to have survived while ending up in a hospital as a Jane Doe, only to fully recover to confront Lillian and Beatrice upon learning they were going to give a speech before Congress in her stead.
 Lord Frederick Bellacourt, played by Jason Ritter, is the youngest child and the heir to the Bellacourt family fortune. He is the illiterate twin brother of Beatrice, with whom he is involved in an incestuous relationship. He lacks any semblance of ambition, as he appears simple-minded and his life consists of leisure activities. After being set to marry Celery Savoy, Frederick is arranged by the Commodore to be a Senator and then future Vice President of the United States under Theodore Roosevelt.
 Commodore Bellacourt (originally Harold Bellawitz, a fur trapper), played by David Koechner, is the family patriarch and "magnet magnate." Often away on business, he avoids his family when he is home. After disowning Lillian and Beatrice in the season one finale when their scandals are made public, the Commodore takes them back in order to have them annul their husbands and marry into rich families so that he can regain his fortune. He is left bankrupt when the marriages do not pan out, with Dodo buying the manor and banning him from the estate.
 Dorothea "Dodo" Bellacourt, played by Paget Brewster, is the wife of the Commodore and the mother of his first four children. She begins to suspect her husband is having an affair, and delves deeper into her pre-existing morphine addiction to cope. Her condition worsens as the series progresses, and she attempts to quit cold turkey after she forces herself upon the butler Peepers after drinking too much absinthe. In the second season, Dodo flees the Bellacourt estate and joins a nunnery upon finding out that the Commodore plans to have her institutionalized for giving away most of his fortune to charity. Dodo returns after the Commodore sends her divorce papers, the charity organizations she donated to revealed as fronts as she transferred the Bellacourt fortune to the abbey in her name. In the third season, Dodo becomes the sole owner of the Bellacourt estate and bans the Commodore from the premises. 
 Victor Schmemmerhorn-Fish V, played by Brian Huskey, is a self-centered Bavarian married to Lillian who married into the Bellacourt family in order to "stack cash", but feels that he cannot live "on a husband's allowance." A closeted homosexual, he is in a secret relationship with Albert. In the second season, Victor agrees to have his marriage to Lillian annulled on the condition that he be allowed to continue living at the manor. In the third season, Victor is revealed to be the uncle of Adolf Hitler.
 Albert Downsy, Jr., played by David Wain, is married to Beatrice. A closeted homosexual, he is in a secret relationship with Victor. In the second season, Albert agrees to have his marriage to Beatrice annulled on the condition that he be allowed to continue living at the manor.
 Celery Savoy Bellacourt, played by Missi Pyle, is a socialite who becomes engaged to Frederick after his appointment to the United States Senate. But after her marriage to Frederick, Celery is disowned by the Savoy family following the Bellacourts' scandals being made public. She has since attempted to use Frederick as a means to regain her status.

Servants at Bellacourt Manor
 Peepers (formerly Mitchell P. Spiritwalker) played by Michael Ian Black, is the Bellacourt butler, who was adopted and raised by a Native American family as an infant. Though the Bellacourts take no notice of his efforts, Peepers is a stickler for perfect order and hopelessly devoted to the family to the point of killing Scoops LaPue and having feelings for Dodo. Peepers is also Blanche's legal guardian and has the ability to send her to an insane asylum at his discretion. In the second-season finale, Peepers helps Dodo with her plan to steal the Commodore's remaining fortune and temporarily moves to the abbey until Dodo buys the Bellacourt estate in her name.
 Celine/Chair, played by Christina Hendricks (Seasons 1–2), is a former prostitute who became the Commodore's secret mistress and bearing his unborn son. The Commodore arranges for Celine to become a servant at the manor, where Beatrice renames her "Chair". In the season one finale, making her move to acquire the Bellacourt fortune, Celine attempts to kill Dodo. But as she ended up making an enemy out of Blanche when arranging her to be sent to the asylum as revenge for a previous event, resulting with Celine ending up in a coma after being pushed down the stairs. In the second season, regaining consciousness after giving birth to the Commodore's son Kermit, Celine eventually regains her memories and use of her legs while convincing the Commodore to divorce Dodo and marry her. But Celine leaves the Commodore upon him becoming bankrupt.
 Blanche, played by Beth Dover, is the head housemaid. She was diagnosed with hysteria as a nervous disorder and spent time in an asylum, feeling slighted that she was the only patient left unraped by the orderlies. She is easily startled from the experiences she did have there. Following being institutionalized by Celine, later causing her coma, Blanche reveals she got pregnant by one of the orderlies. She is then married by Mr. Peepers to Dr. John Goldberg before giving birth to her son Murry, whom she later has take place of Kermit as she spirits the Bellacourt baby away.
 Garfield Leopold McGillicutty, played by Armen Weitzman, is the under butler/valet, manservant, and later potato scrubber who was taken by Peepers from the orphanage at age 5 to work in the manor. The Bellacourts are his only family and he loves them with a blind devotion, having known nothing else.
 Hamish Crassus, played by Brett Gelman, the foul, unkempt groundskeeper who tends to the grounds of the mansion and performs certain other "special" duties such as kidnapping, "re-conforming to heterosexuality training," and selling women into sexual slavery. While framed for the death of Scoops LaPue, Hamish is revealed to be the Commodore's half brother in season two and is later revealed to be Jewish.
 Flobelle, played by Alice Hunter (Seasons 2-), the new maid hired to replace chair. She is an open-minded woman.

Recurring characters
 Marquis de Sainsbury, played by Thomas Lennon.
 Eunice, played by Kate Micucci, is a member of N.A.G.S who lost use of her left eye following being attacked by Beatrice.
 Abortion Deb, played by Betsy Sodaro, is a member of N.A.G.S.
 Scoops LaPue, played by Brent Weinbach, is a reporter/columnist for Newport's Lookie Loo newspaper. In the first-season finale, LaPue is murdered by Mr. Peepers when he appears to have made the Bellacourt's scandals public in the Lookie Loo.
 Dr. Goldberg, played by Moshe Kasher, is a pansexual Jewish physician who lives on the Bellacourt estate initially to tend Albert while in his coma while having a fling with Victor. Later revealed to be Canadian, Goldberg marries Blanche in a loveless marriage to acquire citizen status.
 Father Black Donahue, played by Jemaine Clement (Seasons 2–3), is a Catholic priest of an abbey on the Bellacourt property who houses Dodo during season 2 and converts Beatrice while she is in the nunnery. Following Dodo stealing the Comodore's fortune, Donahue becomes Dodo's lover and accompanies her to the Bellacourt estate at the start of the 3rd season until he overstays his welcome and abuses Dodo's generosity.

Real-life characters
 Matt Besser as Leon Trotsky, Marxist revolutionary from Russia
 Jared Breeze as an adolescent Adolf Hitler, Victor's gentle nephew, an artistic pacifist whose worldviews are affected by his visit to Newport.
 Cedric the Entertainer as Scott Joplin, composer of ragtime music
 Bebe Drake as Harriet Tubman, abolitionist and humanitarian
 Josh Fadem as Falling Charlie, AKA Charlie Chaplin, an entertainer known for his clumsy falling routine
 Kate Flannery as Anne Sullivan, interpreter for Helen Keller
 Rich Fulcher as Mark Twain, the famous author and adventurer
 Matt Gourley as Albert Einstein, a theoretical physicist who sees the brilliance of Beatrice
 Tim Heidecker as Andrew Carnegie, a steel magnate
 Billy Merritt as William Howard Taft, a politician aspiring to a position in the White House
 Mike O'Connell as Theodore Roosevelt, President of the United States
 Michael Welch as Franklin Delano Roosevelt, President of the United States
 Gil Ozeri as Harry Houdini, magician/illusionist called in by Lillian to conduct a seance to rid the manor of its ghosts
 Chris Parnell as psychologist Dr. Sigmund Freud, sent to vet Frederick for membership in the U.S. Senate
 Ravi Patel as Mohandas Gandhi, lawyer and political leader from India
 June Diane Raphael as Eleanor Roosevelt, niece of the current President and unofficially engaged to another distant cousin, Franklin
 Paul Scheer as artist Pablo Picasso
 Shoshannah Stern as Helen Keller, blind and deaf advocate for women
 Ben Stiller as Charles Ponzi, a businessman who was once engaged to Lillian and attempts to rekindle their relationship so he can con her family out of their fortune. But he ends up being murdered by his Indian boy-servant Tabu.
 Stephen Tobolowsky as Thomas Edison, an inventor and pornographer
 Vincent Rodriguez III and Jimmy O. Yang as conjoined twins Chang and Eng Bunker

Episodes

Series overview

Season 1 (2015)

Season 2 (2016)

Season 3 (2018)

Ratings

Season 1 (2015)

Season 2 (2016)

Season 3 (2018)

References

External links
 
 

2015 American television series debuts
2018 American television series endings
2010s American LGBT-related comedy television series
2010s American parody television series
2010s American single-camera sitcoms
Comedy Central original programming
English-language television shows
Incest in television
Television series about families
Television series by Red Hour Productions
Television series set in the 1900s
Television shows set in Rhode Island
American LGBT-related sitcoms